Granit may refer to the following people:
Given name
Granit Lekaj (born 1990), Kosovo–born Swiss–Albanian football player
Granit Rugova (born 1985), Kosovan basketball player
 Granit Taropin (born 1940), Russian wrestling coach
 Granit Xhaka (born 1992), Swiss-Albanian football player

Surname
 Ragnar Granit (1900–1991), Finnish scientist
Yalçın Granit (born 1932), Turkish basketball player, coach and sports journalist